Oleh Ivanovych Samsonenko (born 3 August 1965 in Zhytomyr) is a former Ukrainian football player.

References

1965 births
Living people
Footballers from Zhytomyr
Soviet footballers
FC Polissya Zhytomyr players
FC Shakhtar Horlivka players
FC Zirka Kropyvnytskyi players
FC Kryvbas Kryvyi Rih players
FC Metallurg Lipetsk players
Ukrainian footballers
FC Ural Yekaterinburg players
Ukrainian expatriate footballers
Expatriate footballers in Russia
Russian Premier League players

Association football goalkeepers